Zahir Uddin Swapan is a Bangladesh Nationalist Party politician and the former Member of Parliament of Barisal-1.

Career
Swapan was elected to parliament from Barisal-1 as a Bangladesh Nationalist Party candidate in October 2001.

References

Bangladesh Nationalist Party politicians
Living people
8th Jatiya Sangsad members
Year of birth missing (living people)